Sittin’ on Top of the World (or Sitting on Top of the World) may refer to:

Albums 
 Sittin' on Top of the World (Dean Martin album), 1973
 Sittin' on Top of the World (LeAnn Rimes album), 1998
 Sitting on Top of the World (Nightlosers album), 1995

Songs 
 "I'm Sitting on Top of the World", a 1925 popular song
 "Sitting on Top of the World", a 1930 folk-blues song
 "Sitting on Top of the World" (Liverpool F.C. song), 1986
 "Sittin' on Top of the World", a song by Lenny Kravitz from the 1989 album Let Love Rule
 "Sitting on Top of the World", a song by The Pogues from their 1993 album Waiting for Herb
 "Sitting on Top of the World", a song by Amanda Marshall from her album Amanda Marshall, 1996
 "Sittin' on Top of the World" (Da Brat song), 1996
 "Sitting on Top of the World" (Delta Goodrem song), 2012
 "Sitting on Top of the World", a song by Alexandra Burke from her album Heartbreak on Hold, 2012

See also 
 On Top of the World (disambiguation)
 Top of the World (disambiguation)